Carlos Omar Cauich Castro (born May 13, 1992, in Benito Juárez, Quintana Roo) is a Mexican professional footballer who last played for Alebrijes de Oaxaca.

External links

 

1992 births
Living people
Mexican footballers
Association football forwards
Inter Playa del Carmen players
Pioneros de Cancún footballers
Atlante F.C. footballers
Alebrijes de Oaxaca players
Ascenso MX players
Liga Premier de México players
Tercera División de México players
Footballers from Quintana Roo